Actenoides is a genus of kingfishers in the subfamily Halcyoninae.

The genus Actenoides was introduced by the French ornithologist Charles Lucien Bonaparte in 1850. The type species is Hombron's kingfisher (Actenoides hombroni). A molecular study published in 2017 found that the genus Actenoides, as currently defined, is paraphyletic. The glittering kingfisher in the monotypic genus Caridonax is a member of the clade containing the species in the genus Actenoides.

The genus contains the following species:

 Green-backed kingfisher (Actenoides monachus)
 Black-headed kingfisher (Actenoides monachus capucinus)
 Scaly-breasted kingfisher (Actenoides princeps)
 Plain-backed kingfisher (Actenoides princeps regalis)
 Moustached kingfisher (Actenoides bougainvillei)
Guadalcanal moustached kingfisher (Actenoides bougainvillei excelsus)
 Spotted wood kingfisher (Actenoides lindsayi)
 Hombron's kingfisher (Actenoides hombroni)
 Rufous-collared kingfisher (Actenoides concretus)

References

 
Bird genera
Taxa named by Charles Lucien Bonaparte
Taxonomy articles created by Polbot